Mordellistena podlussanyi is a species of beetle in the genus Mordellistena of the family Mordellidae. It was described by Csetó in 1990.

References

Beetles described in 1990
podlussanyi